Parkman is a census-designated place in southern Parkman Township, Geauga County, Ohio, United States.  It has a post office with the ZIP code 44080.  It lies along U.S. Route 422 at its intersection with State Routes 88, 168, and 528.

Demographics

History
Parkman was laid out in 1804. The community has the name of Samuel Parkman, an official with the Connecticut Land Company. A post office called Parkman has been in operation since 1806.

Notable person
 Seth Ledyard Phelps, United States Navy officer, politician, and diplomat

References

External links
Parkman Township website

Census-designated places in Ohio
Census-designated places in Geauga County, Ohio